You Need a Mess of Help to Stand Alone is the first compilation album by English band Saint Etienne, released on 6 December 1993 by Heavenly Recordings. It compiles singles and B-sides released by the group during the period between 1990 and 1993, most notably the non-album singles "Kiss and Make Up" (1990), "Speedwell" (1991), "Join Our Club/People Get Real" (1992) and "Who Do You Think You Are" (1993). The compilation's title is derived from the song of the same name by the Beach Boys.

Receiving good reviews, the compilation was released on CD, cassette and LP formats. Artwork was designed by Anthony Sweeney with photography by Aude Prieur and James Fry. Before its release as a standalone compilation album, the disc was originally packaged in a 2CD limited edition reissue of So Tough.

All tracks have since been released on other compilations and deluxe editions of the group's studio albums rendering the compilation technically obsolete.

Track listing

 Tracks 2, 3 and 5 are B-sides to "You're In A Bad Way"
 Tracks 8 and 10 are B-sides to "Avenue"
 Track 6 is the B-side to "Only Love Can Break Your Heart"
 Track 11 is the B-side to "Nothing Can Stop Us"

Personnel
Credits adapted from the liner notes of You Need a Mess of Help to Stand Alone.

 Debsey – additional vocal ("Who Do You Think You Are")
 Donna Savage – vocal ("Kiss and Make Up")
 Q-Tee – vocal ("Filthy")
 Aude Prieur – booklet photography
 James Fry – Saint Etienne picture
 Anthony Sweeney – design
 Author Unknown – liner notes (extract from Brian Clough, Folk Hero)

Charts

References

1993 compilation albums
Heavenly Recordings compilation albums
Saint Etienne (band) compilation albums